Saniye Gülser Corat is an expert in gender equality. She served as UNESCO’s director for gender equality from September 2004 to August 2020.

Biography 
Gülser Corat attended Robert College and Bogazici University in Istanbul, Turkey. She also completed a graduate degree in European studies at the College of Europe in Bruges, Belgium, and a graduate degree in international political economy at the Norman Patterson School of International Affairs at Carleton University in Ottawa, Canada. She has a post-graduate degree from Harvard University's John F. Kennedy School of Government, USA.

In September 2004 she joined UNESCO as director for gender equality. During her tenure, she negotiated and secured a unanimous vote by 195 member states to designate gender equality a global priority for the organization in 2007.

She launched special campaigns and programmes for girls’ education in STEM, digital skills, safety of women journalists, women in science and women in sport.  She initiated and managed research, shedding light on emerging issues such as gender bias in voice assistants powered by AI that culminated in the publication of the report I’d Blush if I Could in March 2019. This report sparked a global conversation with the technology sector through her keynote address at the largest global meeting of the technology sector, the Web Summit, in 2019 and interviews with more than 600 media outlets around the globe - including the BBC, CNN, CBS, ABC, NYT, The Guardian, Forbes, Time

Gülser Corat serves on the boards of Women’s Leadership Academy (China), International Advisory Committee for Diversity Promotion, Kobe University (Japan), UPenn Law School Global Women’s Leadership Project (USA), and Exponent, a global gender equality incubator.

References 

Carleton University alumni
Academic staff of Carleton University
Year of birth missing (living people)
Living people
Boğaziçi University alumni
College of Europe alumni
Harvard Kennedy School alumni